Thomas Holden may refer to:
Thomas Holden (general) (1741–1823), American Revolutionary War General and Justice of the Rhode Island Supreme Court
Thomas Douglas Percy Holden (1859–1938), Australian politician
Thomas Sinclair Holden (1906–1973), Australian politician and judge and son of Thomas Douglas Percy Holden
Tim Holden or Thomas Timothy Holden (born 1957), United States politician